Shin-ike Dam is an earthfill dam located in Aichi Prefecture in Japan. The dam is used for irrigation. The catchment area of the dam is 0.2 km2. The dam impounds about 1  ha of land when full and can store 22 thousand cubic meters of water. The construction of the dam was started on 1988 and completed in 1989.

References

Dams in Aichi Prefecture
1989 establishments in Japan